Ordnance Depot may refer to:
 Atlanta Ordnance Depot, Georgia
 Black Hills Ordnance Depot
 Erie Ordnance Depot
 Hawthorne Ordnance Depot, near Hawthorne, Nevada (now Hawthorne Army Depot)
 Holabird Ordnance Depot
 Letterkenny Ordnance Depot, near Carlisle, Pennsylvania (now Letterkenny Army Depot)
 Navajo Ordnance Depot, at Bellemont, Arizona (noe Camp Navajo)
 Ogden Ordnance Depot, near Ogden, Utah (now Defense Depot Ogden)
 Portage Ordnance Depot
 Pueblo Ordnance Depot, east of Pueblo, Colorado (now Pueblo Chemical Depot)
 Shumaker Ordnance Depot
 Stockton Ordnance Depot
 Terre Haute Ordnance Depot
 Thatcham Ordnance Depot
 Umatilla Ordnance Depot